The Campeonato Paraibano Third Division is the third tier of football league of the state of Paraíba, Brazil. The third division was created in 2021 and had only 3 clubs.

Clubs

The following teams was competed in the 2022 Campeonato Paraibano Third Division

List of champions

Titles by team

Teams in bold stills active.

By city

References

  
Paraibano